Ethnic studies, in the United States, is the interdisciplinary study of difference—chiefly race, ethnicity, and nation, but also sexuality, gender, and other such markings—and power, as expressed by the state, by civil society, and by individuals. "The unhyphenated-American phenomenon tends to have colonial characteristics," notes Jeffrey Herlihy-Mera in After American Studies: Rethinking the Legacies of Transnational Exceptionalism: "English-language texts and their authors are promoted as representative; a piece of cultural material may be understood as unhyphenated—and thus archetypal—only when authors meet certain demographic criteria; any deviation from these demographic or cultural prescriptions are subordinated to hyphenated status." As opposed to International studies, which was  originally created to focus on the relations between the United States and Third World Countries, Ethnic studies was created to challenge the already existing curriculum and focus on the history of people of different minority ethnicity in the United States. Ethnic studies is an academic field that spans the humanities and the social sciences; it emerged as an academic field in the second half of the 20th century partly in response to charges that traditional social science and humanities disciplines such as anthropology, history, literature, sociology, political science, cultural studies, and area studies were conceived from an inherently Eurocentric perspective. Its origin comes before the civil rights era, as early as the 1900s. During this time, educator and historian W. E. B. Du Bois expressed the need for teaching black history. However, Ethnic Studies became widely known as a secondary issue that arose after the civil rights era. Ethnic studies was originally conceived to re-frame the way that specific disciplines had told the stories, histories, struggles and triumphs of people of color on what was seen to be their own terms. In recent years, it has broadened its focus to include questions of representation, racialization, racial formation theory, and more determinedly interdisciplinary topics and approaches.

History
In the United States, the field of ethnic studies evolved out of the Civil Rights Movement during the 1960s and early 1970s, which contributed to growing self-awareness and radicalization of people of color such as African-Americans, Asian Americans, Latino Americans, and American Indians. Ethnic studies departments were established on college campuses across the country and have grown to encompass African American Studies, Asian American Studies, Raza Studies, Chicano Studies, Mexican American Studies, Native American Studies, Jewish Studies, and Arab Studies.
 
The first strike demanding the establishment of an Ethnic Studies department occurred in 1968, led by the Third World Liberation Front (TWLF), a joint effort of the Black Student Union, Latin American Students Organization, Asian American Political Alliance, Pilipino American Collegiate Endeavor, and Native American Students Union at San Francisco State University. This was the longest student strike in the nation's history and resulted in the establishment of a School of Ethnic Studies. President S. I. Hayakawa ended the strike after taking a hardline approach when he appointed Dr. James Hirabayashi the first dean of the School (now College) of Ethnic Studies at San Francisco State University, and increased recruiting and admissions of students of color in response to the strike's demands. In 1972, The National Association for Ethnic Studies was founded to foster interdisciplinary discussions for scholars and activists concerned with the national and international dimensions of ethnicity encouraging conversations related to anthropology, Africana Studies, Native Studies, Sociology and American Studies among other fields.

Minority students at The University of California at Berkeley- united under their own Third World Liberation Front- the TWLF, initiated the second longest student strike in US history on January 22, 1969. The groups involved were the Mexican American Student Confederation, Asian American Political Alliance, African American Student Union, and the Native American group. The four co-Chairmen of the TWLF were Ysidro Macias, Richard Aoki, Charlie Brown, and LaNada Means.

This strike at Berkeley was even more violent than the San Francisco State strike, in that more than five police departments, the California Highway Patrol, Alameda County Deputies, and finally, the California National Guard were ordered onto the Berkeley campus by Ronald Reagan in the effort to quash the strike. The excessive use of police force has been cited with promoting the strike by the alienation of non-striking students and faculty, who protested the continual presence of police on the Berkeley campus. The faculty union voted to join the strike on March 2, and two days later the Academic Senate called on the administration to grant an interim Department of Ethnic Studies. On March 7, 1969, President Hitch authorized the establishment of the first Ethnic Studies Department in the country, followed by the establishment of the nation's first College of Ethnic Studies at San Francisco State University on March 20, 1969. In 1994, with Taiwanese government's support, National Dong Hwa University established the first Ethnic Studies institute in Taiwan, the Graduate Institute of Ethnic Relations and Cultures, which nowadays is one of leading institution of Ethnic Studies in Asia for its Austronesian and Taiwanese Indigenous Studies.

Courses in ethnic studies address perceptions that, because of the Eurocentric bias and racial and ethnic prejudice of those in power, American historians have systematically ignored or undervalued the roles of such ethnic minorities as Asian Americans, Blacks, Mexicans, Latinos and Native Americans. Ethnic studies also often encompasses issues of intersectionality, where gender, class, and sexuality also come into play. There are now hundreds of African American, Asian American, Mexican American and Chicano/Latino Studies departments in the US, approximately fifty Native American Studies departments, and a small number of comparative ethnic studies programs. College students, especially on the East Coast, continue to advocate for Ethnic Studies departments. The Ethnic Studies Coalition at Wellesley College, the Taskforce for Asian and Pacific American Studies at Harvard University, and CRAASH at Hunter College are among student organizations calling for increased institutional support for Ethnic Studies. Ethnic studies as an institutional discipline varies by location. For instance, whereas the Ethnic Studies Department at UC Berkeley comprises separate "core group" departments, the department at UC San Diego does not do so.

In May 2016 there was another Hunger Strike that took place at San Francisco State University. It was started by Hassin Bell, Julia Retzlaff, Sachiel Rosen, and Ahkeel Mesteger, all students at SFSU, in the attempt to both defend and improve the College of Ethnic Studies. They were on strike for 10 days and their strike reached national attention that helped end the strike with a signed compromise from the SFSU president Leslie Wong. The compromise consisted of allocating $250,000 to the Ethnic Studies department.

Schools of thought
While early ethnic studies scholarship focused on the repressed histories and identities of various groups in the U.S., the field of study has expanded to encompass transnationalism, comparative race Studies, and postmodernist/poststructuralist critiques. While pioneering thinkers relied on frameworks, theories and methodologies such as those found in the allied fields of sociology, history, literature and film, scholars in the field today utilize multidisciplinary as well as comparative perspectives, increasingly within an international or transnational context. Central to much Ethnic Studies scholarship is understanding how race, class, gender, sexuality, ability, and other categories of difference intersect to shape the lived experiences of people of color, what the legal scholar Kimberlé Crenshaw calls intersectionality. Branches of ethnic studies include but are not limited to African American Studies, Asian American Studies, Native American/ Indigenous Peoples' Studies, and Latino/a Studies.

A discipline within ethnic studies is African American Studies, which consist of studying people of African descent and their ideologies, customs, cultures, identities, and practices by drawing on social sciences and the humanities. The changes made to educational and social institutions by the U.S. Civil Rights movement of the 1960s and 1970s can be traced as the origin for the development of African American Studies as a discipline. In general, the changes made to the higher education system to incorporate African American Studies has been led by student activism. When initially created, in many cases to end protests, the African American Studies programs at predominately white universities were underfunded and not highly esteemed. Since the 1970s, African American Studies programs, in general, have become reputable and more concretely established within predominantly white universities. Historically, African American scholars and their works have been used as sources to teach African American Studies. Teaching African American Studies has been categorized by two methods: Afrocentric, which relies solely on text by black authors and are led by all-black faculties, and traditional methods, which are more inclusive of non-black authors and are more broad in their studies. Scholars whose work was influential to the development of African American Studies, and whose work is studied include W.E.B. Du Bois, Booker T. Washington, Carter G. Woodson, and George Washington Williams. The first historically black college or university to offer a variation of African American Studies was Howard University, located in Washington D.C.

Native American Studies, or sometimes named Native Studies or American Indian Studies, is another branch of ethnic studies which was established as a result of university student protest and community activism. The first attempts at establishing some form of Native American Studies came in 1917 from Oklahoma Senator Robert Owen, who called for an 'Indian Studies' program at the University of Oklahoma. Several decades later, the "Red Power" Movement of the 1960s, in a time of high minority and suppressed group activism in the US, sought to get Native American Studies into higher education. San Francisco State University and University of California at Berkeley were the first to adopt these fields into their departments in 1968. The TCU (tribal colleges and universities) movement of the 1960s aimed to expand the teaching of Native American Studies by establishing tribe-run universities to educate the tribe's youth and their communities. Navajo Community College, later renamed Diné College, was the first of these institutions. Curriculum in Native American Studies programs teach the historical, cultural and traditional aspects of both natives of the land in general, as well as that of the American Indians specifically. Figures within Native American Studies include Vine Deloria Jr., an American Indian scholar and rights' activist, Paula Gunn Allen who was a writer and educator of Native American Studies, poet Simon J. Ortiz.

Asian American Studies, different than Asian Studies, is a subfield within ethnic studies, which focuses on the perspectives, history, culture, and traditions of the Asian peoples' in the United States. Asian American Studies originated in the late 1960s at the San Francisco State College (now San Francisco State University) where a student strike led to the development of the program at the school. The historical approach to representing Asia in the United States prior to the introduction of Asian American Studies has been Orientalism which portrays Asia as a polar opposite to anything western or American. To counter this historical representation of ideas, Asian American Studies became one of the interdisciplinary fields that emphasized teaching the perspective, voice, and experience of the minority community. In terms of the ethnicities being studied, there are distinctions between Asian Americans (Chinese, Japanese, Filipino Americans for example) and Pacific Islanders (Samoan Americans), but those groups tend to be grouped as a part of Asian American Studies. Prose, plays, songs, poetry (Haiku) and several other forms of writing were popular during the 1970s as methods of Asian American expression. Among the most read authors were Frank Chin, Momoko Iko, Lawson Fusao Inada, Meena Alexander, Jeffery Paul Chan, and John Okada, who were considered by Asian American scholars to be pioneers of Asian American literature.

Most recently, "whiteness" studies has been included as a popular site of inquiry in what is traditionally an academic field for studying the racial formation of communities of color. Instead of including whites as another additive component to ethnic studies, whiteness studies has instead focused on how the political and juridical category of white has been constructed and protected in relation to racial "others" and how it continues to shape the relationship between bodies of color and the State. As Ian Haney-Lopez articulates in White By Law: The Legal Construction of Race, the law has functioned as the vehicle through which certain racialized groups have been included or excluded from the category of whiteness across time, and thus marked as inside or outside the national imaginary (read as white) and the privileges that result from this belonging. Important to whiteness studies, according to scholars such as Richard Dyer, is understanding how white bodies are both invisible and hypervisible, and how representations of whiteness in visual culture reflect and, in turn, shape a persistent commitment to white supremacy in the U.S. even as some claim the nation is currently a colorblind meritocracy. In addition to visual culture, space also reproduces and normalizes whiteness. The sociologist George Lipsitz argues that whiteness is a condition rather than a skin color, a structured advantage of accumulated privilege that resurfaces across time spatially and obscures the racism that continues to mark certain bodies as out of place and responsible for their own disadvantage. Such attention to geography is an example of the way ethnic studies scholars have taken up the study of race and ethnicity across almost all disciplines using various methodologies in the humanities and social sciences.

In general, an "Ethnic Studies approach" is loosely defined as any approach that emphasizes the cross-relational and intersectional study of different groups. George Lipsitz is important here as well, demonstrating how the project of anti-black racism defines the relationship between the white spatial imaginary and other communities of color. Thus, the redlining of the 1930s that prevented upwardly mobile African Americans from moving into all-white neighborhoods also forced Latino and Asian bodies into certain spaces.

Relationship to other fields

Ethnic studies exists in dialogue—and occasional tension—with a variety of related fields and disciplines.

In the case of traditional disciplines, ethnic studies often confronts resistance if not outright hostility to its mission. With many departments clinging to the ideal of objective and detached scholarship, the field is generally seen as a more politicized (and therefore, for some, a more troubling) form of academic inquiry. This hostility reflects, in some cases, a disinterest in the diversification of subject areas and the preservation of historically prominent fields. In the case of interdisciplinary fields, as ethnic studies has moved from a study of specific racial and ethnic groups towards the scrutiny of power dynamics, it has grown closer to fields like African American studies, Asian American studies, Native American studies, Latino studies, and American studies. Even more recently, ethnic studies has grown philosophically and politically closer to LGBTQ studies.

"Ethnic Studies" is often housed within departments or units with many different names. Teaching units often have a range of different names—Critical Ethnic Studies, Comparative American Cultures, Ethnic Studies, or American Studies and Ethnicity—for curricula and faculty who are gathered together under the same set of academic interests. A wide variety of curricula are employed in the service of each of these rubrics. Occasionally, the gap between American Studies and Ethnic Studies can be productively bridged, especially in departments where the bulk of faculty focus on race and ethnicity, difference and power. But that bridgework can be troublesome, obscuring one foci and sharpening the emphasis on another.

As a consequence of this great variation, though, ethnic studies needs to be understood within its specific institutional context. And, despite considerable financial (and often political) pressure to consolidate or eliminate ethnic studies within American Studies—or to house Native American studies, Latino studies, and Asian American studies within either ethnic studies or American Studies—the relationships between these fields should be considered within each institution's governing eco-system.

Professional associations

Association for Ethnic Studies

The Association for Ethnic Studies (AES) was founded in 1972 by several scholars who wanted to study race through an interdisciplinary approach. It was previously known as the National Association for Ethnic Studies (NAES), and was initially named the National Association of Interdisciplinary Studies for Native-American, Black, Chicano, Puerto Rican, and Asian Americans. The organization was officially renamed as NAES in 1985, and then to its current name in 2018. It is the oldest ethnic studies association in the United States.

From its founding, the organization has strived to promote scholarship, research, and curriculum design for its members. The organization hosts an annual conference.

AES also publishes the Ethnic Studies Review, a peer-reviewed journal for scholarship in ethnic studies, published by the University of California Press.

Critical Ethnic Studies Association (CESA)

The Critical Ethnic Studies Association began with its first conference in March 2011 at the University of California Riverside, Critical Ethnic Studies and the Future of Genocide: Settler colonialism/Heteropatriarchy/White Supremacy. This prompted the people who had organized and partaken in the conference to form the association. The second conference then took place in September 2013 at the University of Illinois Chicago and it was themed, Decolonizing Future Intellectual Legacies and Activist Practices. The third conference took place from April 30-May 2015 at York University in Toronto and it is titled, Sovereignties and Colonialisms: Resisting Racism, Extraction and Dispossession.

In some instances, ethnic studies has become entrapped within and similar to the mandates of liberal multiculturalism, which relies on politics beholden to US nation-building and capitalist imperatives. Ethnic studies is in a difficult position, because as it gets more legitimized within the academy, it has frequently done so by distancing itself from the very social movements that were the triggers for its creation. On the other hand, ethnic studies departments have always existed on the margins of the academic industrial complex, and became further marginalized through funding cuts due to the 2008 global economic crisis. Instead of just dismissing or wholly embracing identitarian nationalism, CESA seeks to construct an open dialogue around issues like white supremacy, settler colonialism, capitalism, and heteropatriarchy, militarism, occupation, indigenous erasure, neocolonialism, anti-immigration anti-Islam, etc. in order to expand the parameters and capacities of ethnic studies.

CESA's goal is not to romanticize all movements or dictate a specific relationship between scholars and activists. Instead, it questions the emphasis of professionalization within ethnic studies, the politics of the academic industrial complex, or the engagement of larger movements for social transformation. It recognizes that at times Ethnic Studies has been complicit in neutralizing the university, rather than questioning the university's ideologies, actions, regulation and production of knowledge, and power. It works to situate the university as a point of contention, as a location among many for political struggles. CESA invites participation from all types of people: scholars, students, activists, arts, media makers, and educators of all fields, generations, and disciplines. The Critical Ethnic Studies Association was founded as a transnational, interdisciplinary, and un-disciplinary association of scholars, activists, students, artists, media makers, educators, and others who are directly concerned with interrogating the limitations of ethnic studies in order to better engage the historical stakes of the field. It organizes projects and programs to reimagine ethnic studies and its future through new interventions, both scholarly and activist based. They aim to develop an approach to scholarship, institution building, and activism animated by the spirit of the decolonial, antiracist, and other global liberationist movements that enabled the creation of Ethnic Studies in the first place. It hopes that this approach will continue to inform its political and intellectual projects.

Within the organization, there is an emphasis on counteracting institutional marginalization, revisiting the ideas that prompted the creation of ethnic studies, and creating new conversations that challenge US hegemony in traditional ethnic studies. Their goals include establishing an interdisciplinary network of scholars and activists stimulating debate on critical ethnic studies, providing forums such as the biannual conference or dialogues thought seminars, social media, etc. There is also a focus on publishing a journal, Critical Ethnic Studies, for new scholarship, and to facilitate dialogues that are critical and constructive between activist and academics.

In high schools

In California schools
While ethnic studies courses have had a presence throughout high schools in Southwest states, there have been attacks on the discipline in the past couple of years, with the state of California never fully enforcing such courses in its high schools. However, students and educators of school districts across Southern California are pushing towards implementing ethnic studies courses into school requirements. The El Rancho Unified School District (ERUSD), which serves the area of Pico Rivera, became the first school district in California to require an ethnic studies class as part of its students' graduation requirement in 2014. The ethnic studies resolution in ERUSD was both drafted and proposed by ERUSD's board President, Aurora Villon and Vice President, Jose Lara and was presented as an effort to "expose ... students to global perspectives and inclusion of diversity". This graduation requirement for ERUSD high school students is expected to be fully implemented by the 2015–2016 academic school year.

In a similar move, Los Angeles Unified School District (LAUSD) will also begin to require ethnic studies courses in its high schools and will include such courses in its A-G graduation requirements. In November 2014, the LAUSD board approved a resolution proposed by board members Bennett Kayser, George McKenna and Steve Zimmer. The ethnic studies curriculum will begin as a pilot program in at least five high schools. It is expected that by the 2017–2018 academic school year, every high school will offer at least one course in ethnic studies and the class would be compulsory by the time the class of 2019 graduates. While LAUSD board members proposed the resolution, many students took on the efforts by creating petitions and rallies in support of the ethnic studies resolution. In February 2021, the California Board of Education approved a curriculum to include the contributions of Asian, Black, Latino, and Native Americans. This included the approval of 33 optional lesson plans for schools to choose from.

In New York schools

The New York State government has implemented the Dignity for All Students Act (DASA) which requires administrative, supervisory, and student service personnel to be trained in "Harassment, Bullying, Cyber bullying, and Discrimination in Schools: Prevention and Intervention". In this case, ethnic studies is framed through the lens of "bullying" as a challenge for minority students to get the most out of their education in a safe classroom environment. For the creators of DASA, bullying has the potential to disrupt a student's bodily and emotional safety.

DASA aims to do the following:

DASA is designed to protect public schools students from bullying by employees or other students based on actual or perceived race, color, weight, national origin, ethnic group, religion, religious practice, disability, sexual orientation, gender, or sex.
DASA requires schools and districts to revise codes of conduct to prohibit bullying and promote a bully-free environment, and to include age-appropriate versions of the policy in codes of conduct. School districts will be required to post codes of conduct on their websites by July 1, 2013.
DASA requires K-12 schools to incorporate curriculum that promotes awareness of and sensitivity to discrimination and diversity as part of civility and citizenship classes.
DASA requires every school to nominate a Dignity Act Coordinator that will be responsible for handling incidents of bullying.
DASA requires schools to collect and report data on bullying to the New York State education commissioner at least once a year.
DASA prohibits retaliation against anyone who reports incidents of bullying.
DASA holds the State education commissioner responsible for helping school districts develop effective responses to bullying that are focused on solutions, intervention and education.

In Arizona schools 
See the section below titled "Arizona ban."

Scholars whose work is associated with ethnic studies
*Rodolfo Acuña
Norma Alarcón
Frederick Luis Aldama
Gloria E. Anzaldúa 
Gregory Cajete
Kimberlé Crenshaw
Philip J. Deloria
José Esteban Muñoz
Joe Feagin
Paula Gunn Allen
Evelyn Hu-DeHart
Richard Delgado
Elizabeth Hoover
Elaine H. Kim
Winona LaDuke
Robert G. Lee
George Lipsitz
Ian Haney López
Cherríe Moraga
Frances Negrón-Muntaner
Michael Omi
Simon J. Ortiz
Nell Irvin Painter
Alejandro Portes
Juana María Rodríguez
Tricia Rose
Kenneth Shropshire
Audra Simpson
Andrea Smith
Ilan Stavans
Howard Winant

Criticism
Ethnic studies has always been opposed by different elements. Proponents of ethnic studies feel that this is a reactionary movement from the right. They note the rise of the conservative movement during the 1990s in the United States, in which the discipline came increasingly under attack. For proponents, the backlash is an attempt to preserve "traditional values" of Western culture, symbolized by the United States. For some critics, this  is a slant by proponents to disparage criticism by false association to right wing ideology. They have no objection about African, Latino or Native American culture being legitimate topics of academic research.  What they object to is the current state of ethnic studies which they see as characterized by excessive left wing political ideology, postmodernist relativism which, in their view, greatly undermined the scholarly validity of the research. However, ethnic studies is accused of promoting "racial separatism", "linguistic isolation" and "racial preference".

In 2005, Ward Churchill, a professor of ethnic studies at University of Colorado at Boulder, came under severe fire for an essay he wrote called "On the Justice of Roosting Chickens", in which he claimed that the September 11 attacks were a natural and unavoidable consequence of what he views as unlawful US policy, and referred to the "technocratic corps" working in the World Trade Center as "little Eichmanns". Conservative commentators used the Churchill affair to attack ethnic studies departments as enclaves of "anti-Americanism" which promote the idea of ethnic groups as "victims" in US society, and not places where serious scholarship is done.

In the face of such attacks, ethnic studies scholars are now faced with having to defend the field. In the media, this takes form of characterizing the attack as right wing reactionary movement. For example, Orin Starn, a cultural anthropologist and specialist in Native American Studies at Duke University, says: "The United States is a very diverse country, and an advocate would say we teach kids to understand multiculturalism and diversity, and these are tools that can be used in law, government, business and teaching, which are fields graduates go into. It promotes thinking about diversity, globalization, how we do business and how we work with nonprofits."

In reaction to criticisms that ethnic studies academics undermine the study of a unified American history and culture or that ethnic studies are simply a "colored" version of American Studies, defenders point out that ethnic studies come out of the historically repressed and denied presence of groups within the U.S. knowledge-production, literature and epistemology. Efforts to merge ethnic studies with American studies have been met with fierce opposition as was the case at UC Berkeley. While the field is already decades old, the ongoing creation of new ethnic studies departments is fraught with controversy. Administrators at Columbia University attempted to placate student protests for the creation of an Ethnic Studies Department in 1996 by offering American Studies as a compromise.

Arizona ban

On May 11, 2010, Arizona Governor Jan Brewer signed House Bill 2281 (also known as HB 2281 and A.R.S. §15–112), which prohibits a school district or charter school from including in its program of instruction any courses or classes that
Promotes the overthrow of the Federal or state government or the Constitution
Promotes resentment toward any race or class (e.g. racism and classism)
Advocates ethnic solidarity instead of being individuals
Are designed for a certain ethnicity
But the law must still allow:
Native American classes to comply with federal law
Grouping of classes based on academic performance
Classes about the history of an ethnic group open to all students
Classes discussing controversial history

Coming off the heels of SB 1070, Superintendent of Public Instruction Tom Horne was adamant about cutting Mexican-American Studies in the Tucson Unified School District.  He devised HB 2281 under the belief that the program was teaching "destructive ethnic chauvinism and that Mexican American students are oppressed". In January 2011, Horne reported TUSD to be out of compliance with the law. In June of that year, the Arizona Education Department paid $110,000 to perform an audit on the TUSD's program, which reported "no observable evidence was present to suggest that any classroom within the Tucson Unified School District is in direct violation of the law." John Huppenthal (elected Superintendent as Horne became Attorney General) ordered the audit as part of his campaign promise to "Stop La Raza", but when the audit contradicted his own personal findings of noncompliance, he discredited it. Despite a formal appeal issued on June 22, 2011 by TUSD to Huppenthal, Judge Lewis Kowal backed the Superintendent's decision and ruled the district out of compliance in December, 2011. On January 10, 2012 the TUSD board voted to cut the program after Huppenthal threatened to withhold 10% of the district's annual funding. Numerous books related to the Mexican-American Studies program were found in violation of the law and have been stored in district storehouses, including William Shakespeare's The Tempest, Paolo Freire's Pedagogy of the Oppressed, and Bill Bigelow's Rethinking Columbus: The Next 500 Years.

Supporters of MAS see HB 2281 as another attack on the Hispanic population of Arizona. This is due partly to the fact that none of the other three ethnic studies programs were cut. Support for the ethnic studies programs subsequently came from scholars, community activist groups, etc. For example, The Curriculum Audit of the Mexican American Studies Department refuted all of the violations under House Bill 2281. The audit instead recommended that the courses be implemented further, given the positive impacts of the courses on the students. In addition to the defense of the ethnic studies department, the UN Charter of Human Rights challenges the bill as a violation of fundamental human, constitutional, and educational rights (Kunnie 2010). A 2011 documentary, Precious Knowledge directed by Ari Palos and produced by Eren McGinnis for Dos Vatos Productions, argues that while 48% of Hispanic students drop out, TUSD's program had become a model of national success, with 93% of enrolled students graduating and 85% going on to college.  The film shows a 165-mile community run from Tucson to Phoenix in protest of the state's decision, as well as student-led marches and stand-ins. 
In one instance, students overtook a board meeting by chaining themselves to the board members' chairs.  A student protest group, UNIDOS (United Non-Discriminatory Individuals Demanding Our Studies), has remained active speaking out before legislators and school board members on behalf of the program. In a separate case, two students and 11 teachers sued the state, contending that the law is unconstitutional.  The teachers, however, have been denied standing in the lawsuit as public employees.

Appeal of Arizona ban 
The Mexican American Studies course was first brought under attack after the Deputy Superintendent of Public Education gave a speech to students, countering an allegation that "Republicans  hate Latinos." The students walked out of the speech, and Tom Horne, the Superintendent, blamed the rudeness of the students on the teachers from their Mexican American Studies courses. He called for removal of the courses. When his call was not answered, he made an effort for a bill to be put into law banning Mexican American Studies courses.

House Bill 2281, which prohibited the Mexican American Studies courses, was approved in December 2010. In an effort to enforce the bill, the district court gave the Superintendent of the school district the right to withhold funding to schools that continue to teach the ethnic studies course. Judge Kowal ruled the course “biased, political, and emotionally charged,” and upheld both the bill and the withholding of funding from schools.

An appeal was filed in October 2010. The initial appeal was challenging House Bill 2281 for violation of First Amendment (for viewpoint discrimination) and Fourteenth Amendment (for void-for-vagueness) rights. This initial appeal was filed by 10 teachers, the director of the Mexican American Studies program, and 3 students and their parents. Once the students graduated, 2 dropped their appeals, and the teachers and program director were dismissed for want of standing in January 2012. This left one student and her father on the appeal.

In March 2013, the appeals court ruled only in favor of the plaintiffs on the grounds that there was a First Amendment overbreadth violation to House Bill 2281. The plaintiffs decided to further appeal the case.

On July 7, 2015, the appeal on the ban of the Mexican American Studies, "Maya Arce vs Huppenthal", reached a federal appeals court. Overseen by Judge Rakoff, the court reversed part of what the district court had ruled on banning the course. Judge Rakoff looked at the 4 categories (listed above) that constitute which classes are prohibited.

Rakoff's statement said that House Bill 2281 was created with the Mexican American Studies course in mind. Since the Mexican American studies course was the only course in Arizona to be banned, it became clear that the bill had targeted the one course. This led the court to find the bill to be partially unconstitutional as it did not require similar Mexican American Studies courses outside of the Tucson Unified School District to cease teaching the courses. The bill also did not ban African American Studies courses that were being taught.

Rakoff's final ruling affirmed part of the bill to be unconstitutional regarding the plaintiff's First Amendment right. However, Rakoff upheld the district court's ruling that the bill is not over broad. Rakoff sent part of the appeal back to the district court to review the claim that the bill is discriminatory.

In August 2017, a different federal judge found that the bill was motivated by discriminatory intent, and struck down the ban on ethnic studies as unconstitutional. The judge ruled that the ban had been passed "not for a legitimate educational purpose, but for an invidious discriminatory racial purpose and a politically partisan purpose."

See also 

 African-American studies
 Arab studies
 Armenian studies
 Latino Studies
 Chicana/o studies
 Jewish studies
 Romani studies
 Asian American studies
 Native American studies
 Slavic studies
 Whiteness studies

References

External links

Arizona Students Protest New Law Banning Ethnic Studies Classes – video report by Democracy Now!
Association for Ethnic Studies

 
Postmodernism